South Dennis station was a railway station located on the Great Western Road in South Dennis, Massachusetts. The station was torn down after passenger rail service to the Outer Cape ended in 1940.

References

External links

Dennis, Massachusetts
Old Colony Railroad Stations on Cape Cod
Stations along Old Colony Railroad lines
Demolished buildings and structures in Massachusetts
Former railway stations in Massachusetts